Myrrhidendron is a genus of flowering plants belonging to the family Apiaceae.

Its native range is Southeastern Mexico to Ecuador.

Species
Species:

Myrrhidendron chirripoense 
Myrrhidendron donnellsmithii 
Myrrhidendron glaucescens 
Myrrhidendron maxonii 
Myrrhidendron pennellii

References

Apioideae
Apioideae genera